Potštát is a town in Přerov District in the Olomouc Region of the Czech Republic. It has about 1,200 inhabitants. The historic town centre is well preserved and is protected by law as an urban monument zone.

Administrative parts
Villages of Boškov, Kovářov, Kyžlířov and Lipná are administrative parts of Potštát.

Geography
It lies in the Nízký Jeseník mountain range.

History

The first written mention of Potštát is in a deed from 1318–1322, where it is already referred to as a town. In the second half of the 14th century, Potštát was acquired by the Kunštát and Poděbrady family. The town obtained the brewing privilege by Boček II of Poděbrady in 1388. The town flourished and crafts developed. In 1408, Tas of Prusinovice bought Potštát. During the rule of the Prusinovice family, the town further developed.

For participating in the Bohemian Revolt, their properties were confiscated and Potštát was donated to illegitimate daughter of Rudolf II, Karolina d'Austria. During the Thirty Years' War in 1642–1645, the town was looted and damaged five times by various armies. In the 1660s, Potštát was bought by the Walderode family, who restored the town in the Baroque spirit and gave the square its present appearance. The town's economy relied on crafts, especially cloth making, weaving and shoemaking.

Potšát was affected by the Seven Years' War and by the Napoleonic Wars, during which many young people left. The town was also seriously damaged by fires in 1787 and 1813, which destroyed most of the buildings and the local castle. In 1814, Potštát became a property of the Desfours-Walderode family and recovered.

From 1938 to 1945 it was one of the municipalities in Sudetenland.

Sport
Ski Resort Potštát is a small ski resort near the town.

Sights

The landmarks of the town  are the Potštát Castle and the Church of Saint Bartholomew with gothic core. The church lacks a clock and in the middle of the town square there is a separate clock tower.

A fortress from the 14th century was rebuilt into a Renaissance castle by the Prusinovský family in the 16th century. In the 19th century, after it was damaged by fire, the castle was rebuilt in the Empire style. Today it houses the  municipal office, a kindergarten, a library, and an exposition on the history of Potštát and its surroundings.

In the southern part of the municipal territory is located the Potštát Rock Town with lots of bizarre rock formations, and the ruin of the medieval Puchart Castle.

Notable people
Ernst Hampel (1885–1964), Austrian politician

References

External links

Cities and towns in the Czech Republic
Populated places in Přerov District